The Legislative Assembly of Vancouver Island, sometimes House of Assembly of Vancouver Island, was the colonial parliamentary body that was elected to represent voters in the Colony of Vancouver Island.  It was created in 1856 after a series of petitions were sent to the Colonial Office in London protesting the Hudson’s Bay Company’s proprietary rule over the colony.  It was the first elected assembly in British North America west of Ontario. Although at first only handful of colonists met the voting requirement, and most of those that did were tied to the HBC, the franchise was gradually extended, and the assembly began to assert demands for more control over colonial affairs, as well as criticize colonial governor Sir James Douglas's inherent conflict of interest as both governor and Hudson Bay Company's chief factor.

History

At first the island was divided into four districts, and the assembly consisted of eight members: one from each of Nanaimo and Sooke, two from Esquimalt, two from Metchosin and three from Victoria. In the election on July 22, 1856, Victoria, which had the greatest number of qualified voters at five, was the only district contested.

the 1860 election used nine districts with the Victoria Town having two members and Victoria District having three members.

The 1863 election also used nine districts but Victoria city had four and Victoria District had three members.

The power of the Assembly was severely limited. Despite the protests of newspapermen such as Amor de Cosmos, Douglas appointed the members of his government according to his own agenda, regardless of who dominated the Assembly. The governor also maintained control over the legislative process through the Legislative Council, an upper house of a sort that had its members appointed directly. However, the Assembly did have one significant power: it had to approve any use of public funds.

The colonies of Vancouver Island and British Columbia were joined into a new single colony, the United Colonies of Vancouver Island and British Columbia, in 1866, and the Legislative Assembly of Vancouver Island ceased to exist.  Its role was filled in the new colony by the Legislative Council of British Columbia.

Leaders and parties

Dr. John Sebastian Helmcken, chosen as the first Speaker of the Assembly, would remain in that role until British Columbia joined Canadian Confederation in 1871. He was Douglas's son-in-law, and like his fellow assemblymen Surveyor-General Joseph Despard Pemberton and HBC company-man Joseph McKay, was considered part of what Amor De Cosmos termed the "family-company compact". John Muir, a sawmill-owner and coalmaster who represented Sooke, had also recently been in the employ of Douglas. James Yates, the Victoria publican, and Thomas Skinner, the farmer, were the voices of dissent in the assembly, always at odds with the company and its men. 

As franchise widened and the assembly became more influential, this division remained. Reformers such as Amor de Cosmos and Leonard McClure, who began to truly challenge the power of Douglas and his successor Arthur Edward Kennedy, continued to butt heads with establishment supporters such as George Hunter Cary, Henry Pering Pellew Crease and Robert Burnaby and William Fraser Tolmie.

Elections to the Vancouver Island House of Assembly 
1856 Vancouver Island Election
1860 Vancouver Island Election
1863 Vancouver Island Election

See also
Legislative Council of British Columbia

References

Bibliography
 Barman, Jean. The West Beyond the West: A History of British Columbia (Toronto: University of Toronto Press, 1991).
 Conrad, Margaret, and Alvin Finkle, History of the Canadian Peoples: Vol: I Beginnings to 1867, 4th ed. (Toronto: Pearson Longman, 2006) 
 Duffus, Maureen. Vancouver Island's First Legislature Retrieved June 11, 2007

History of Vancouver Island
Defunct unicameral legislatures
Colony of Vancouver Island
Vancouver Island